Mario David Aguilar (born 23 May 1925) is a Salvadoran sailor. He competed in the 1968 Summer Olympics.

References

External links
 

1925 births
Possibly living people
Sailors at the 1968 Summer Olympics – Flying Dutchman
Salvadoran male sailors (sport)
Olympic sailors of El Salvador
Sportspeople from San Salvador